Paul Sikes (born 1982 in Nashville, Tennessee, United States) is an American singer-songwriter and record producer, who released his debut album, Craft: by Paul Sikes on July 10, 2012. He has also established his own production company, 7-Layer Productions.

Career
Sikes was raised in Clarksville, Tennessee and is the son of a preacher. He graduated from Northeast High School. He started playing piano at age 8, and guitar by age 13. He also plays mandolin, banjo and dobro. He started performing very early. He did a minor in Classical Guitar Performance at Lipscomb University, then transferred to Middle Tennessee State University, earning a degree in the Recording Industry with an emphasis on Music Business.

He had his first deal with Giantslayer Music Publishing joint-ventured with State 1 Songs. He won ASCAP's annual Leon Brettler Award which is given to a promising young and upcoming songwriters. He applied for television musical competition Nashville Star singing "Man of Constant Sorrow", but did not qualify for the finals. In 2011, he signed a second deal with Sony ATV. As a published writer, he procured cuts with Emerson Drive, Billy Dean, Josh Gracin, Jordyn Shellhart, and Justin van Sant. He also continued performing at the Bluebird Café and The Listening Room in Nashville. He sings mostly country music, with jazz, blues and folk influences.

During a trip to Nashville, Hoda Kotb, a co-host at NBC's Today show saw Sikes performing at the Bluebird Cafe and was impressed. She mentioned him on Today and showed a one-minute clip of his performance of "A Seed", one of his compositions. Eventually Sikes was invited to the Today program where, on July 13, 2012, he performed one of his own compositions called "My Epitaph"

He started his own independent production company, 7-Layer Productions through which he released his album Craft: By Paul Sikes online, after recording it in his Green Hills home studio in Nashville. Release date coincided with his national television appearance. The album, also available as a download on iTunes includes 11 tracks, all his compositions. The physical CD release also has a bonus track written by his grandmother. Through his production company, he is also working for albums with rising acts Tonya Lynette Stout and Koriander.

Discography

Albums
2012:Craft: by Paul Sikes (released on 7 Layer Productions on July 10, 2012)
Track list:
"Show You How" (3:35) – songwriters: Paul Sikes, Jordyn Shellhart
"Swear I'm in a Small Town" (3:27) – songwriters: Paul Sikes, Charlie Hutto, Steven Darden
"A Seed" (3:57) – songwriters: Paul Sikes, Trent Jeffcoat, Tonya Stout
"I Can Give You One" (3:12) – songwriters: Paul Sikes, Justin Wilson, David Byrnes
"Dysfunction" (3:43) – songwriters: Paul Sikes, Justin Wilson, Brandy Clark
"Tin Man" (2:53) – songwriters: Jennifer Zuffinetti, Ben Caver, Drew Davis
"Train Wreck" (2:45) – songwriters: Paul Sikes, Tim Johnson
"My Epitaph" (3:59) – songwriter: Paul Sikes
"Me, You and Malibu" (2:53) – songwriters: Paul Sikes, Rich Jacques
"Sittin' By a River" (4:15) – songwriters: Paul Sikes, Trent Jeffcoat, Kevin Barton
"Call It a Day" (3:19) – songwriters: Paul Sikes, Adam Wheeler

References

External links
Official website
Myspace
YouTube

1982 births
Living people
Songwriters from Tennessee
Record producers from Tennessee
People from Nashville, Tennessee
21st-century American singers
21st-century American male singers
American male songwriters